NLP may refer to:

Computing and mathematics 
 Natural language processing, a field of computer science and linguistics 
 Natural-language programming, a programming paradigm
 Nonlinear programming, solving optimisation problems with nonlinear constraints

Libraries
National Library of Poland
National Library of the Philippines

Other uses
Neuro-linguistic programming, a pseudoscientific method aimed at modifying human behavior
No light perception, a diagnosis of severe blindness

See also 
National Labour Party (disambiguation)
National Liberal Party (disambiguation)
National Liberation Party (disambiguation)
Natural Law Party (disambiguation)
New Labour (disambiguation)